Kalateh-ye Bala may refer to:
 Kalateh-ye Bali, in North Khorasan Province
 Kalateh-ye Bala, Qaen, in South Khorasan Province
 Kalateh-ye Bala, Sarbisheh, in South Khorasan Province

See also
 Kalat-e Bala (disambiguation)